RCR may stand for:

 Fulton County Airport (IATA: RCR)
 Radio Caracas Radio, a Venezuelan radio station
 Ranchi Rays, Indian field hockey team
 Rational consequence relation, a type of consequence relation in mathematical logic
 Ramsbottom Carbon Residue
 RC Relizane, an Algerian football club
 Real closed ring, in mathematics
 Responsible Conduct of Research
 Research and Development Center for Radio Systems, see Association of Radio Industries and Businesses
 Resorts of the Canadian Rockies Inc.
 Retro City Rampage, a 2012 video game
 Rhodes, Chalmers & Rhodes, a vocal group consisting of Charles Chalmers, Sandy Rhodes, and Donna Rhodes, the latter two formerly of the singer-songwriter duo The Lonesome Rhodes
 Richard Childress Racing, a championship-winning NASCAR team
 Richland Creek Reservoir, in the U.S. state of Georgia
 Riot City Ravens, a roller derby league in Newport, Wales
 River City Renaissance, a 1993 urban renewal program in Jacksonville, Florida
 River City Rollergirls, a roller derby team in Richmond, Virginia
 The Royal Canadian Regiment (The RCR)
 Rolling circle replication, in nucleic acid replication
 Royal College of Radiologists, a British professional body

See also